Lucas Malcotti (born 9 January 1995) is a Swiss épée fencer.

He participated at the 2019 World Fencing Championships, winning a medal.

References

External links

1995 births
Living people
Swiss épée fencers
Swiss male fencers
World Fencing Championships medalists
Fencers at the 2020 Summer Olympics
Olympic fencers of Switzerland
20th-century Swiss people
21st-century Swiss people